Grossmont can mean:

 A neighborhood in western El Cajon, California and northern La Mesa, California.
 Grossmont College, a community college in El Cajon, California
 Grossmont High School, in La Mesa, California
 Grossmont Middle College High School, in El Cajon, California
 Grossmont Transit Center (MTS Transit Center), a San Diego Trolley station
 The Grossmont Union High School District in San Diego County, California

See also
Grosmont (disambiguation)